The Dream That Stuff Was Made Of is the debut studio album by the indie pop band Starlight Mints.

The title references the line "The stuff that dreams are made of" from The Maltese Falcon, and, second-handedly, Shakespeare:  In Act IV of The Tempest, Prospero says "We are such stuff / As dreams are made on, and our little life / Is rounded with a sleep."

Production
The album was recorded in 1997 and 1998, years before it was released by See Thru Broadcasting.

Critical reception
Pitchfork called the album "a short, well-sequenced offering of punchy orchestral pop." The Houston Press wrote that the album "offers honest-to-God anthems with catchy refrains that sound happy even when they aren't."

Track listing

References

2000 albums
Starlight Mints albums
Albums produced by Dave Sardy